Route 554, or Highway 554, may refer to:

Canada
 Ontario Highway 554

Israel
Route 554 (Israel)

United States